George Martin Dixon (April 10, 1901 – August 23, 1991) was an American rugby union player who competed in the 1924 Summer Olympics.  Dixon was born in Vallejo, California. He played rugby for the Olympic Club RFC in San Francisco, and was a member of the American rugby union team which won the Olympic gold medal in Paris.

References

External links
Profile Olympic record 
Profile on ESPN Scrum

1901 births
1991 deaths
American rugby union players
Rugby union players at the 1924 Summer Olympics
Olympic gold medalists for the United States in rugby
United States international rugby union players
Medalists at the 1924 Summer Olympics
Sportspeople from Vallejo, California